The T-90 is a third-generation Russian main battle tank developed from the T-72. It uses a 125mm 2A46 smoothbore main gun, the 1A45T fire-control system, an upgraded engine, and gunner's thermal sight. Standard protective measures include a blend of steel and composite armour, smoke grenade dischargers, Kontakt-5 explosive reactive armour (ERA) and the Shtora infrared anti-tank guided missile (ATGM) jamming system.

The T-90 was designed and built by Uralvagonzavod, in Nizhny Tagil, Russia. It entered service with the Russian Army in 1992.

Development
The T-90 has its origins in a Soviet-era program aimed at developing a single replacement for the T-64, T-72 and T-80 series of main battle tanks. The T-72 platform was selected as the basis for the new generation of tank owing to its cost-effectiveness, simplicity and automotive qualities. The Kartsev-Venediktov Design Bureau from Nizhny Tagil was responsible for the design work and prepared two parallel proposals—the Object 188, which was a relatively simple upgrade of the existing T-72B tank (Object 184), and the far more advanced Object 187—only vaguely related to the T-72 series and incorporating major improvements to the hull and turret design, armor, powerplant and armament. Development work was approved in 1986 and the first prototypes were completed by 1988. The vehicles resulting from the Object 187 program have not been declassified to this date.

The Object 188 was engineered by a team under V.N. Venediktov. The biggest change was the integration of the 1A45 fire-control system of the T-80U. The Object 188 was initially designated as the T-72BM. The first four of these were delivered for trials in January 1989. An improved variant (called the T-72BU) was delivered beginning in June 1990. In March 1991, the Soviet Ministry of Defense recommended that the Army adopt the Object 188. Work on the Object 187 was simultaneously stopped for unknown reasons.

Production and service history

Russian tank production dwindled in the years before and after the breakup of the Soviet Union. The Kharkov tank plant belonged to the newly independent Ukraine, the Chelyabinsk Tractor Plant ended production in 1989, and Kirov in Leningrad in 1990. In the two remaining tank plants at Omsk and Nizhni-Tagil, state orders all but ceased in 1992. Around the same time, the Russian Ministry of Defense decided it would commit to eventually producing just one tank type.

During the 1980s, the Soviet military had ordered T-64s, T-72s and T-80s, then in simultaneous production from rival tank design firms. Though all three tanks had similar characteristics, they each required different components, which contributed to the Army's logistical burden. Though both Nizhni-Tagil's T-90 and Omsk's T-80U had their merits, the T-80's gas turbine engine was notorious for its high fuel consumption and poor reliability. Additionally, Russian T-80s suffered heavy losses in their first combat use during the First Chechen War. T-90s, which were not deployed to Chechnya, were spared media criticism in spite of the similarly poor performance of the T-72 in the same conflict.

In January 1996, Colonel General Aleksandr Galkin, chief of the Main Armor Directorate of the Russian Ministry of Defense, said the Russian Armed Forces would phase out T-80 production in favor of the T-90 (Galkin reversed his position later that year, claiming the T-80U was a superior tank). Production of the T-80 at Omsk persisted until 2001, mainly for the export market.

The principal upgrade in the T-90 is the incorporation of a slightly modified form of the T-80U's more sophisticated 1A45T Irtysh fire control system and an upgraded V-84MS multi-fuel engine developing 840 hp (618 kW). The T-90 was manufactured at the Uralvagonzavod factory in Nizhny Tagil, with low-level production being carried out since 1992 and virtually ceasing towards the end of the 1990s for the native market. Around 120 T-90 tanks were delivered to the Russian Ground Forces before production of an upgraded version was resumed in 2004.

By September 1995, some 107 T-90 tanks had been produced, located in the Siberian Military District.

Facing tapering domestic orders, Uralvagonzavod received government approval to export the T-90 in the mid-1990s. The designers at Uralvagonzavod created a new, welded turret that offered improvements in protection and internal space in the same period. In 1997, India signaled interest in the T-90 in response to Pakistan's acquisition of 320 Ukrainian T-80UD tanks. India's Heavy Vehicles Factory in Avadi was already license-manufacturing the T-72 under the name "Ajeya".

The first 42 complete Indian tanks were delivered in 2001 and were designated T-90S (Object 188S), still equipped with the older cast turrets of the early series (this exhausted the remaining stocks of cast turrets warehoused at Nizhny Tagil) and powered by the V-84 engine making 840 hp (618 kW). In 2002, 82 vehicles were delivered, now equipped with the new welded turrets and the V-92S2 engine, generating 1,000 hp (735 kW). The initial contract stipulated the following batch of 186 tanks, now officially called Bhishma, to be completed in India from Russian-supplied kits, and then gradually replaced with domestically manufactured parts. Delays in domestic production compelled the Indian authorities to place an additional order for 127 complete vehicles from Uralvagonzavod.

In 2005 the Russian army resumed delivery of the T-90, requesting the "original" specification for the vehicle with a cast turret. But with the new order numbering a 14 tanks, and the large capital investment required to set up production of new cast turrets, the Russian Ministry of Defence agreed on a new configuration very close to the Indian T-90S, which was expeditiously accepted into service without any trials as the Object 188A1 or T-90A. 2005 saw delivery of 18 new tanks – enough to equip approximately five tank platoons. These new Russian tanks were powered by the V-92S2 engine, carried a T01-K05 Buran-M gunner's sight (passive-active night-vision channel with an EPM-59G Mirage-K matrix and a maximum observation distance of 1,800 m) and were protected by the most recent Kontakt-5 reactive armor with 4S22 explosive tiles.

The years 2006–2007 saw the delivery of 31 T-90A tanks each, now fitted with entirely passive ESSA main gunner's sights supplied by Peleng in Belarus and using the 2nd-generation thermal camera Catherine-FC from Thales, and improved 4S23 ERA tiles. The joint venture established on the basis of JSC Volzhsky Optical and Mechanical Plant" (VOMZ) and Thales Optronics, produced Catherine-FC thermal imaging devices, which were further used to develop "ESSA", "PLISA" and "SOSNA-U" sighting systems produced for the Russian armoured vehicles, including T-72B3 tanks and export versions of T-90S (exported to India, Algeria and Azerbaijan). Since 2012, Russia was able to produce 3rd-generation Catherine-XP cameras based on QWIP matrix technology.

In 2012, the Russian-made commander combined sample supervisory-sighting system "T01-K04DT/Agat-MDT" was presented to the public at the International Forum Engineering Technologies 2012. According to Krasnogorsky Zavod plant, Agat-MDT has the ability to install (for further modernization) in the sight the newly developed domestic UPF format 640×512 by 15 microns, which makes possible in the future to extend the range of target identification at night to 3.5–4.0 km without modifications to the sight.

In 2016, the Krasnogorsk plant finished testing the Irbis-K night-vision sighting system for the T-80U and T-90, with first deliveries planned for 2017. Completion of the Irbis-K, the first Russian-produced mercury cadmium telluride (MCT) matrix thermal sight, addressed a disadvantage of Russian tanks relative to their Western counterparts. The Irbis-K can identify targets at ranges up to 3,240 meters during day and night.

The Russian-made thermal imaging device not only meant that Russian tanks would no longer need to be equipped with foreign parts, but it also meant that complete tank modernization was cheaper. The new tank gunner’s heat-vision sight Irbis-K and the commander’s combined sighting and observation system Agat-MDT can be supplied to T-90 upgraded version (T-90M), replacing ESSA system with Catherine-FC thermal imager from Thales.

In 2007, there were about 334 T-90 tanks of various types serving in the Russian Ground Forces' 5th Guards Tank Division, stationed in the Siberian Military District, and seven T-90 tanks assigned to the marines. Since 2008, the Russian army has received 62 tanks annually, suspending orders in 2011.

After the cancellation of the T-95 in 2010, Uralvagonzavod began the OKR Armata (Armament) design study. The study resulted in the Object 148 based on the T-95 (itself based on the Object 187). The Russian Army curtailed T-90 orders beginning in 2012 to prepare for the arrival of the new tank. In July 2021, Industry and Trade Minister Denis Manturov said the tank, designated the T-14 Armata, will enter serial production in 2022.

Deliveries of upgraded T-90M tanks started in April 2020 to the Guards Tank Army of the RF Western Military District. The T-90M ‘Proryv’ has received a principally new turret, the 2A46M-5 gun, and a more powerful engine. The Proryv is outfitted with a new multi-channel sighting system that allows employing weapons at any time of day or night and it can exchange data with other vehicles in real time. A new batch was delivered in March 2021. According to Ukrainian intelligence sources manufacturing of T-90s has slowed because of the effect of International sanctions since the start of the invasion of Ukraine. New batches of T-90M tanks were delivered to Russian troops in May, August and December 2022 and in January 2023.

Videos of 22 newly produced T-90M tanks that are  being deployed to combat in Lugansk oblast of Ukraine were uploaded by Russian telegram channels.

Combat use

Russian service
An early variant of the export-oriented T-90S allegedly saw combat action during the 1999 Chechen invasion of Dagestan instead of being delivered to India. The tank's survivability against rocket-propelled grenades (RPGs) is disputed. Gordon L. Rottman writes that T-90s were "frequently" knocked out by three or four hits from a RPG-7. He adds that Chechens found a way to compromise T-90s fitted with explosive reactive armor: they would fire an RPG-7 from close range (within 50m) to trigger the explosive reactive armor protection, and then re-attack the exposed tank armour underneath with two or more RPG hits, again from close range.

On the other hand, Moscow Defense Brief gives the example of one T-90 that remained in action despite being hit by seven RPGs. The journal concluded that with regular equipment, the upgraded T-90 seems to be the best protected Russian tank, especially with the implementation of Shtora-1 and Arena defensive systems.

The T-90A was deployed to Syria in 2015 to support the Russian involvement in the Syrian Civil War.

In September 2020, a Russian T-90 was accidentally hit by an anti-tank guided missile (ATGM) during exercises held in Russia's Astrakhan region causing serious damage to the vehicle.

Russo-Ukrainian War

During the war in Donbas stage of the Russo-Ukrainian War in the summer of 2014, elements of the Russian 136th Guards Motor Rifle Brigade equipped with T-90A tanks conducting operations in Luhansk Oblast of Ukraine were identified in social media posts, and locations of their photographs georeferenced by open-source investigators.

As of 27 February 2023, Oryx blog has documented that Russia has lost at least 55 T-90s during the 2022 Russian invasion of Ukraine, including 34 T-90A (19 destroyed, 2 abandoned, 13 captured), 1 T-90AK (1 captured), 6 T-90S (4 destroyed, 1 abandoned, 1 captured) and 14 T-90M (7 destroyed, 3 damaged, 2 abandoned, 2 captured). During this conflict, the T-90 faced thousands of anti-tank missiles, including modern "top attack" missiles such as the American-produced FGM-148 Javelin and the Anglo-Swedish NLAW, which have been known to be able to defeat these tanks. Russia developed a modern defense system called Arena, which is an active protection system (APS) developed for the purpose of protecting T-90 from destruction by anti-tank weapons, anti-tank guided missiles, and missiles with top attack warheads. But Arena has not appeared in the Ukraine war.

Russian forces attempted to counter these top-attack missiles by adding improvised steel grilles—sometimes referred to as "cope cages" due to skepticism from military analysts over their effectiveness—to the top of the turret. This improvised armour adds weight to the tank, increases its visual profile, and makes it more difficult for the crew to escape from the tank. Analysts have speculated that they may be potentially used as a countermeasure against RPG-7s fired from above during urban combat, loitering munitions, or against drone attacks, as a response to lessons learned from the 2020 Nagorno-Karabakh war. The lack of uniformity of the makeshift cages made from different meshes and iron fences suggest that they are largely improvised by the tank crews, and are not standard issue.

On May 4, 2022 in Kharkiv Oblast, Ukraine, a T-90M Proryv-3 was destroyed in action, the first confirmed destroyed in the war. The tank, which appeared near Kharkiv on 25 April, was destroyed by soldiers of the 127th Territorial Defence Brigade.  On September 18 in Kharkiv Oblast, Ukraine, a T-90M was captured - the first confirmed in the war. As of 4 December a second T-90M had been captured by the Ukrainian Army. As of the 10th of January 2023, at least 5 T-90S export variant had been lost whilst in Russian service.

Syrian service
In early February 2016, Syrian Army forces began using T-90As in combat. A video was leaked on the internet which showed a T-90 survive a direct frontal turret hit by a TOW missile in Aleppo. The Kontakt-5 reactive armor discharged the TOW warhead before impact. Two Syrian Army operated T-90 were captured by HTS militias while ISIS fighters captured a third in November 2017. A rebel operated T-90 was recaptured by Syrian government forces while the second was reportedly destroyed in combat by a T-72. Another 5 Syrian Army operated T-90 tanks were destroyed or heavily damaged and other 4 suffered hits according to recorded material.

Azerbaijani service
Azerbaijan used their T-90S tanks during the 2020 Nagorno-Karabakh conflict. One T-90 was damaged and captured by Armenian forces. At least two were confirmed destroyed in the initial phases of the war, being the first ever proven total loss of the combat vehicle.

Export

India

In 2001, India purchased 310 T-90S tanks from Russia, of which 124 were delivered complete (42 featured the early cast turrets seen on Russian tanks) and 186 were to be assembled from kits delivered in various stages of completion with an emphasis on shifting production to domestic means. The T-90 was selected because it is a direct development of the T-72 that India already manufactured, simplifying training and maintenance. India opted to acquire the T-90 to counter Pakistani deployment of the Ukrainian-made T-80 tank in 1995–97. These T-90S tanks were made by Uralvagonzavod and the engines were delivered by Chelyabinsk Tractor Plant. The Indian tanks however omit the Shtora-1 passive electronic countermeasure system which was deemed obsolete.

A follow-on contract, worth US$800 million, was signed in October 2006, for another 330 T-90S "Bhishma" MBTs that were to be manufactured in India by Heavy Vehicles Factory at Avadi, Tamil Nadu.

The T-90S Bhishma (named after the guardian warrior in the Mahabharata) is a vehicle tailored for Indian service, improving upon the T-90S, and developed with assistance from Russia and France. The tanks are equipped with the French Thales-built Catherine-FC thermal sights. They use Russian Kontakt-5 explosive reactive armour, in addition to the primary armor, which consists of laminated plates and ceramic layers with high-tensile properties. The new welded turrets first developed for the Indian T-90S Bhishma have more advanced armour protection than the early cast turrets.

In 2021 the Indian army was looking to upgrade its T-90 tank fleet with locally built modular Active Protection, with both soft kill and hard kill systems, to update the tanks to modern standards.

A third contract, worth $1.23 billion, was signed in December 2007 for 347 upgraded T-90Ms, most to be licence-assembled by HVF. The Army hoped to field a force of over 21 regiments of T-90 tanks and 40 regiments of modified T-72s. The Indian Army began receiving its first T-90M main battle tank in completely knocked-down form from Russia's Nizhny Tagil-based Uralvagonzavod JSC at the end of 2009.

The T-90M features the 'Kaktus K-6' bolted explosive reactive armour (ERA) package on its frontal hull and turret-top (the T-90S has 'Kontakt-5' ERA), is fitted with an enhanced environmental control system supplied by Israel's Kinetics Ltd for providing cooled air to the fighting compartment, has additional internal volume for housing the cryogenic cooling systems for new-generation thermal imagers like the THALES-built Catherine-FC thermal imager (operating in the 8–12 micrometre bandwidth). In all, India plans to have 2,080 T-90 tanks in service by 2020.

The first batch of 10 T-90Ms built under licence was inducted into the Indian army in August 2009. These vehicles were built at the Heavy Vehicles Factory at Avadi, Tamil Nadu.

A  purchase of 354 new T-90SM tanks for six tank regiments for the China border was approved in 2012, taking the total number of T-90 tanks in the Indian Army to 2011 and making India, with a total of nearly 4,500 tanks (T-90 and variants, T-72 and Arjun MBT) in active service, the world's third-largest operator of tanks.

India planned to have 21 T-90 tank regiments by 2020, with 45 combat tanks and 17 training and replacement tanks per regiment. In November 2019, India announced that Heavy Vehicles Factory would produce 464 T-90S MBTs.

Other
In 2005, deliveries began for an initial order of 185 tanks for Algeria. These are known as the T-90SA ("A" is an acronym for Algeria).

The Cyprus House Defence Committee approved funds in January 2009 for the purchase of 41 Russian-built T-90 tanks. The money was included as part of the 2009 defence budget. Cyprus already operates the Russian-made T-80 tank. In March 2010 it was reported that Cyprus had opted for 41 additional T-80s instead of purchasing T-90s.

Anonymous Venezuelan defence sources said that president Hugo Chavez "wants to replace his army's obsolete AMX-30 main battle tanks with between 50 and 100 Russian-built T-90 main battle tanks," according to an October 2008 article by analyst Jack Sweeney. In September, 2009 a deal was announced for 92 T-72s only. Saudi Arabia was reported, in July 2008, by Russian daily Kommersant to be in negotiations to buy 150 T-90 tanks. Lebanese Defence Minister Elias El Murr met with Russian Defence Minister Anatoly Serdyukov in December 2008, when they discussed the possibility of a transfer of military equipment including T-90 tanks.

In February 2010, an arms deal was signed between Libya and Russia. Details of the sale were not immediately released, but a Russian diplomat stated that Libya had wanted 20 fighter planes, air defence systems, and may also be interested in purchasing "several dozen" T-90s, and modernising a further 140 T-72s. However, after Libya's crackdown on anti-government protesters in early 2011, the United Nations enacted an international arms embargo on Libya resulting in the cancellation of Russian arms deals.

In April 2013, Rosoboronexport requested for the entry of the T-90S in an upcoming tender by the Peruvian Army for main battle tanks. Peru sought to acquire between 120 and 170 tanks to replace its aging T-55 tanks. The T-90 was tested against the M1A1 Abrams from the United States, the Leopard 2A4 offered from the Spanish Army, Leopard 2A6s formerly operated by the Dutch Army, and T-64s and T-84s offered by Ukraine. By September 2013, only the T-90S, the Russian T-80, the Ukrainian T-84, and American M1A1 were still competing.

Vietnam and Iraq signed contracts for at least 150 T-90S/SK tanks in 2016.

Design

Armament

The T-90's main armament is the 2A46M 125mm smoothbore tank gun. This is a highly modified version of the Sprut anti-tank gun, and is the same gun used as the main armament on the T-80-series tanks. It can be replaced without dismantling the inner turret and can fire armour-piercing fin-stabilized discarding sabot (APFSDS), high-explosive anti-tank (HEAT-FS), and high-explosive fragmentation (HE-FRAG) ammunition, and 9M119M Refleks anti-tank guided missiles. The Refleks has semi-automatic command to line of sight (SACLOS) laser beam riding guidance and a tandem shaped charge HEAT warhead. It has an effective range of 100 m to 6 km, and takes 17.5 seconds to reach maximum range.

The NSV 12.7mm (12.7×108) remotely controlled anti-aircraft heavy machine gun can be operated from within the tank by the commander and has a range of 2 km and a cyclic rate of fire of 700–800 rounds per minute with 300 rounds available (the NSV was replaced by the Kord heavy machine gun in the late 1990s). The PKMT 7.62mm (7.62×54mmR) coaxial machine gun weighs about 10.5 kg while the ammunition box carries 250 rounds (2,000 rounds carried) and weighs an additional 9.5 kg.

Like other modern Russian tanks the 2A46M in the T-90 is fed by an automatic loader which removes the need for a manual loader in the tank and reduces the crew to 3 (commander, gunner, and driver). The autoloader can carry 22 ready-to-fire rounds in its carousel and can load a round in 5–8 seconds. It has been suggested that the automatic loaders on modern T-90 tanks have been modified to take advantage of newer ammunition such as the 3BM-44M APFSDS, which like the US M829A3 penetrates armour better than the previous shorter rounds. HEAT rounds that can be fired from the 2A46M includes the 3BK21B (with a depleted uranium liner), 3BK29 (with a credited penetration of 800mm RHA equivalency), and the 3BK29M (with a Triple-tandem charge warhead). Additionally the T-90 features the Ainet fuse setting system which allows the tank to detonate 3OF26 HE-FRAG rounds at a specific distance from the tank as determined by the gunners laser rangefinder, improving its performance against helicopters and infantry. Accurate firing range of the HE-Frag-FS 10 km, APFSDS 4 km.

Fire-control system of the T-90 showed the following features of combat shooting during state testing. Heavily armoured targets at ranges of up to 5 km were hit by tank T-90 on the move (up to 30 km/h) with a high probability of hit with the first shot. During state testing made 24 launches of missiles at ranges of 4–5 km and they all hit the target (all missile launches were made by inexperienced professionals). An experienced gunner at speeds of 25 km/h hit 7 real armoured targets located at ranges of 1,500–2,500 m and 54sec.

Fire-control system on the T-90 includes the PNK-4S/SR AGAT day and night sighting system mounted at the commanders station which allows for night time detection of a tank sized target at ranges between 700 and 1100 metres depending on the version of the sight. Early models of the T-90 were equipped with the TO1-KO1 BURAN sight but later models (T-90S) were upgraded to use the ESSA thermal imaging sight, which allows for accurate firing to a range of 5,000–8,000m during day and 3,300m during night, using the CATHERINE-FC thermal camera produced by Thales Optronique. The driver uses a TVN-5 day and night sight. In 2010, Russia started licensed production of Thales-developed Catherine FC thermal cameras for T-90M tanks, a Russian daily said. These thermal imagers are also present on T-90M "Bhishma" built in India under licence.

In 2012, the Russian-made combined sample of commander supervisory-sighting system T01-K04DT/Agat-MDT was presented to the public. According to Krasnogorsky Zavod (plant), Agat-MDT has the ability to be installed (for further modernization) in the sight of the newly developed domestic UPF format 640×512 by 15 microns, which is possible in the future to extend the range of target identification at night to 3.5–4.0 km without sight modifications. In 2016, the Krasnogorsk plant finished testing the Irbis-K night-vision gunner's sighting system for the T-80U and T-90, with first deliveries in 2018. Completion of the Irbis-K, the first Russian-produced mercury-cadmium-telluride (MCT) matrix thermal sight, will bridge a gap with the leading NATO countries in this area. The Irbis-K can identify tank targets at ranges up to 3,240 meters during day and night.

The Russian-made thermal imaging device not only meant that Russian tanks would no longer need to be equipped with foreign parts, but it also meant that complete tank modernization was cheaper. Furthermore, there will be no decrease in demand for the T-72 and the T-90 in the next few years. The new tank gunner’s heat-vision sight Irbis-K and the commander’s combined sighting and observation system Agat-MDT can be supplied to T-72, T-80 and T-90 upgraded versions (T-72B3M, T-80BVM, T-90M...), replacing the Thales Catherine-FC thermal camera.

Mobility

The prime mover is the V-92S diesel engine, built in the ChTZ. Different models of the T-90 tank are powered by various motors in its initial models, like the V-84MS 618 kW (840 hp) four-stroke V-12 piston engine, uprated  engines and  engines made by Uralvagonzavod and are delivered by Chelyabinsk Tractor Plant. The Т-90S with  engine can attain a top speed of 60 km/h on the road and up to 45 km/h on rough terrain. The T-90 tank has a typical drivetrain arrangement, with a rear placed engine and transmission. The  engines are V-92 four stroke, 12 cylinder, multi-fuel diesel while the  engine is V-96. The T-90 export version i.e. modified T-90S is fitted with an increased power multi-fuel  diesel engine with turbochargers. The tank has an air conditioning system for work in hot places.

Protection

The T-90 has a "three-tiered" protection system. The first tier is the composite armour in the turret, consisting of basic armour shell with an insert of alternating layers of aluminum and plastics and a controlled deformation section.

The second tier is third generation Kontakt-5 explosive reactive armour (ERA) bricks which degrade the penetrating power of kinetic-energy APFSDS ammunition. These bricks give the turret a distinctive angled "clam shell" appearance. ERA bricks are also located on the turret roof to protect against attacks from above. The turret's forward armour package, in addition to the ERA and steel plating, includes Russian composite armour sandwiched between upper and lower steel plates. Composite armour offers lower weight and better protection than steel-only armour.

The third tier is a Shtora-1 (Russian: Штора-1 or "curtain" in English) countermeasures suite, produced by Elektromashina of Russia. This system includes two electro-optical/IR "dazzlers" (i.e. active infrared jammer) on the front of the turret (which gives the distinctive "Red Eyes"), four laser warning receivers, two 3D6 'smoke' grenade discharging systems and a computerised control system. The Shtora-1 warns the tank's crew when the tank has been 'painted' by a weapon-guidance laser and allows the crew to slew the turret to face the threat. The infrared jammer, the TShU1-7 EOCMDAS, jams the semi-automatic command to line of sight (SACLOS) guidance system used by some anti-tank guided missiles. The smoke grenades are automatically launched after Shtora detects that it has been painted. The smoke grenades are used to mask a tank from laser rangefinders and designators, and the optics of other weapon systems. Indian T-90S tanks are not equipped with the Shtora-1 countermeasures suite. They will be equipped with the Land Electronic Defence System LEDS-150.

In addition to the passive and active protection systems, the T-90 is also fitted with nuclear, biological and chemical (NBC) protection equipment, KMT mine sweeps and an automatic fire suppression system. The EMT-7 electromagnetic-counter mine system can also be installed on the T-90. EMT-7 emits an electromagnetic pulse to disable magnetic mines and disrupt electronics before the tank reaches them. The Nakidka signature reduction suite is also available for the T-90. Nakidka is designed to reduce the probabilities of an object to be detected by infrared, thermal, radar-thermal, and radar bands.

During a reported test conducted by the Russian military in 1999 the T-90 was exposed to a variety of RPG, ATGM, and APFSDS munitions. When equipped with Kontakt-5 ERA, the T-90 could not be penetrated by any of the APFSDS or ATGM used during the trial and outperformed a T-80U which also took part. During combat operations in Dagestan, there were witness accounts of one T-90 sustaining seven hits from RPGs, and remaining in action.

T-90M and T-90MS mounts the more advanced "Relikt" ERA. Relikt defends against tandem warheads, while reducing the penetration of APFSDS rounds by over 50 percent. It can be installed instead of Kontakt-1 or Kontakt-5.

Estimated protection level comparison

The T-90A / T-90S turret uses a stronger steel alloy, giving an approximately 10–15% increase in the protection level given from the steel elements of the armor array; as the array from many aspects is not wholly steel, the overall increase in protection is less than this margin over these areas. Protection values will decrease somewhat against Tandem HEAT or penetrators with precursor tips. These measures are not as effective against heavier, newer generations of E.R.A. such as Relikt.

Variants

 T-90 (Object 188) – The first production version. Object 188 (1989), production 1992. Also known as T-72BU. 46 tons.
  – Commander's version of the T-90, with additional communication (R-163-50K station) and navigation equipment (TNA-4-3).
  – Russian army version with welded turret, V-92S2 engine and ESSA thermal viewer. Sometimes called T-90 Vladimir, in honor of its chief designer Vladimir Potkin.
  – Command version of the T-90A.
 T-90AM ("Proryv-2") – Upgrade of T-90A which was later developed into the T-90MS. Featured a new turret developed in the "Proryv-2" program. Revealed in 2011. 48 tons. Not in service.
 T-90M ("Proryv-3") – Heavily upgraded version of the T-90, first appearance in public in 2017. The main feature is modernisation of turret design ("all welded") with the new advanced fire control system Kalina (with integrated combat information and control systems), new Irbis-K gunner`s sight and four video cameras that provide a 360° view of the environment for the commander, new upgraded gun 2A46M-5 with coaxial machine gun 7,62 mm, weapon station "UDP T05BV-1" with remotely controlled machine gun 12,7 mm "Kord". There is improved armor on the ammunition carousel. Each side of the hull is fitted with additional armor plates at the front and bar-slat armor at the rear. The new version also includes brand new Relikt ERA on turret and hull, "soft kill" APS Shtora-1 and "hard kill" APS Arena-M. ERA on the front of the turret is made of one "cast" and is easily replaceable in the field by a crew.  Other improvements include a new 1130hp V-92S2F engine coupled with automatic transmission, an enhanced environmental control system and GLONASS satellite navigation systems. It also features an upgraded autoloader AZ-185M2 which allows for longer (and thus more effective) APFSDS ammunition Svinets-1 and Svinets-2. Much of the ammunition stored outside the autoloader has been moved from around the hull to the rear of the turret.
  – Export version of the T-90, later adopted by the Russian Armed Forces as the T-90A. These tanks were made by Uralvagonzavod and were updated with 1,000hp (750kW) engines made by Chelyabinsk Tractor Plant. These tanks carry an export version of the Shtora-1 passive/active protection system which lacks the infra-red dazzlers carried on the turret, however this area was covered with more Kontakt-5. These were initially supplied with cast turrets of the early T-90, and when stocks were depleted, new, welded turrets were fabricated.
  – Commander's version of the T-90S, with additional communication and navigation equipment. It differs in radio and navigation equipment and Ainet remote-detonation system for HEF rounds.
  – Export variant of T-90AM ("Proryv-2"), first time showed in Abu Dhabi IDEX-2013. It is equipped with a 1,130 hp engine, a PNM Sosna-U gunner sight, a UDP T05BV-1 RWS with a 7.62mm machine gun, GLONASS, inertial navigation systems, new Relikt explosive reactive armour (ERA) that covers more of the tank, and a steering wheel. A new removable turret bustle is included, which provides storage for eight additional rounds. The T-90MS is ready for serial production. Four video cameras provide a 360° view of the environment, while the tank is more connected to command. The T-90SM has an upgraded thermal imager that can detect tanks over 3,300 meters away. The same autoloader as the T-90M "Proryv-3" is used.

Variants
 IMR-3M: Combat engineer vehicle.
 MTU-90: Bridge layer tank with MLC50 bridge.
 UBIM (Universal Armored Engineering Vehicle): It was unveiled at the Army-2018 international arms show.

Operators

Current operators
 : Operates a total of 572 tanks T-90SA, the first deal: 185 tanks, the second deal: 187 tanks, and the third deal, numbering over 200 tanks delivered in December 2016.
 : One T-90S won in Tank Biathlon. Delivered in May 2016. Russia later sent 10-30 T-90S units to Armenia as part of a CSTO agreement.
 : 200 T-90S tanks in service. Some were lost in the 2020 Nagorno-Karabakh war.
 : Currently operates approximately 1100 T-90S 'Bhishma' tanks, both built locally and delivered by Russia. A total of 2078 T-90S 'Bhishma' which were procured in three separate orders. Two batches (124 Russian built tanks and 186 tanks to be built in India in 2001 and a further 124 Russian built tanks and 223 tanks to be built in India in 2007) were purchased from Russia. Heavy Vehicle Factory (HVF) at Avadi has delivered 24 tanks in 2009–10; 51 in 2010–11; another 50–100 were supposed to be delivered in 2012. A further 1,000 were to be produced locally by 2020 under a deal in 2004. Of the first batch of 10, 8 were delivered in August 2009. A ₹13,448 crore (US$1.9 billion) purchase of 464 new T-90MS tanks for 8 tank regiments for the China border has been approved and reportedly signed as of early November 2019. The Indian Army has announced plans to procure driver's night sights based on uncooled thermal imaging technology for 1,400 of its T-90S tanks in order to permit full night operations.
 : 73 T-90S/SK tanks ordered in 2016. The first batch was reportedly followed by another in 2017. The total sum of the contract may exceed one billion U.S. dollars confirmed by Russian presidential aide Vladimir Kozhin. Deliveries reportedly began in November 2017. The first deliveries were confirmed in February 2018. 75 tanks delivered as of June 2018. Two more parties were delivered as of April 2019.
 : 417 T-90/T-90A and T-90M in active service. 200 T-90/T-90A and T-90M in storage. In 2010, Uralvagonzavod received 18 billion rubles (US$294 million) to deliver 261 units until the end of 2010.  All existing T-90 variants were planned to be modernised to T-90M from 2020 to 2025. Deliveries and orders of modernized T-90M continue through 2022 even despite economic sanctions due to the Invasion in Ukraine.
 : The Syrian Army's 4th Mechanized Division deployed several T-90 tanks (both early and late models have been observed in theatre) given by Russia to the Southern Aleppo front in November 2015. Three were captured during the Syrian Civil War, two by HTS rebels and one by ISIS fighters. Another 10 were hit and either damaged or destroyed. In 2017 The Russian Armed Forces delivered 40 T-90A tanks to Syria.
 : Ordered 10 T-90S tanks in 2010 for approximately $30 million. A follow-up order for an additional 30 tanks was later placed.
 : 44 T-90S.
 : At least 12 T-90As, 1 T-90AK, 1 T-90S and 2 T-90Ms have been captured by Ukrainian forces during the 2022 Russian invasion, a number of which have been put into service by the Armed Forces of Ukraine.
 : 64 T-90S/SK in service. The first batch of tanks was reported to have been shipped from Russia in early November 2017. The first and last T-90S arrived in Vietnam in January and February 2019 respectively.

Non-state operators 
  Tahrir al-Sham: At least one captured from the Syrian Army.
 Wagner Group - 2022 in Ukraine.

Future operators
 : In June 2020, Egypt signed a deal with Russia to acquire 500 T-90MS tanks, under a deal that would include local assembly and manufacture.
 : Looking to acquire 146 T-90MS tanks as replacement for M-84. Contract could be signed after being approved by the National Assembly. Russian Presidential aide confirmed that Kuwaiti contract could be signed by the end of 2017, but the acquisition was postponed in 2019.

Failed bids
 : The tank was in the tender for Malaysia, but they selected the Polish tank PT-91M in 2002.
 : Planned to acquire 600 battle tanks and considered the T-90 but instead opted for the Chinese VT-4.

See also

 List of main battle tanks by generation

Notes

References
 Mallika, Joseph (2004) "Issue Brief No. 19: T-90S 'Bhishma'". Institute of Peace and Conflict Studies. URL accessed July 24, 2006.

External links

 T-90 MBT Military Today
 T-90S Third-Generation Main battle tank, uralvagonzavod 
 T-90MS Tagil(Military Today)
 T-90S Main Battle Tank—Bharat Rakshak
 Uralvagonzavod, manufacturer's English-language home page (Russian, T-90 English page)
 The T-90 tank by the Federation of American Scientists
 T-90S Main Battle Tank at the Armor Site
 Main battle tank T-90: Firing sample
 T-90 Main Battle Tank

Main battle tanks of Russia
Tanks with autoloaders
Post–Cold War main battle tanks
Uralvagonzavod products
Military vehicles introduced in the 1990s